Restless is a 2012 British TV adaptation of William Boyd's espionage novel Restless (2006). Directed by Edward Hall, the film features Hayley Atwell, Rufus Sewell, Michelle Dockery, Michael Gambon and Charlotte Rampling. The two parts first aired on 27 and 28 December 2012 on BBC One.

Plot

Part One
The first episode opens in the 1970s with Ruth Gilmartin, a PhD student at St John's College, Cambridge, driving with her young son to visit her mother in her country cottage. When she arrives, her mother, Sally Gilmartin, is nervous and believes that men are watching her from the nearby woods. Ruth mocks her mother's fears. Sally then hands her a notebook with the name "Eva Delectorskaya" on the front, and informs her daughter that Eva Delectorskaya is Sally's real name.

The action then moves to Paris in 1939. Eva, as a young woman, is shown with her brother. The family, which also includes their father, has recently arrived in Paris from Russia. After leaving Eva, her brother is kicked to death in the street by a gang of men. After the funeral, Eva is approached by an man whom she had earlier seen talking to her brother. He introduces himself as Lucas Romer and gives Eva a business card for the company "AAS Ltd".

Later Eva returns to the flat she shares with her father and finds Lucas there. Lucas tells her that he works for the British security services, and her brother was working for him. He tells Eva that war is imminent and that he wants her to become a spy like her brother. Eva is initially reluctant but then agrees after Lucas says that her father can be given free treatment in Britain. She is taken to Scotland for training at a country house, where she proves herself extremely capable at memory tests and a survival exercise.

During this period war breaks out. After her training Lucas tells her that they will be working in Belgium. In Ostend Eva is part of a team fabricating fake news stories to be picked up by the Germans. During this period Eva and Lucas become lovers. She is then selected to observe an operation in the fictitious Dutch border town of Preslo, but the operation goes wrong and results in the death of a Dutch intelligence officer and the capture of SIS officers by the German Sicherheitsdienst (SD-Security Service). This was based on the true events of the Venlo Incident.

Part Two
Eva is sent to the United States as part of a team which uses misinformation and news stories to encourage the U.S. government to support the British war effort. She is ordered by Lucas to seduce the married Mason Harding, an adviser to the president, ostensibly to find out if the Americans intend on joining the war, but actually to blackmail him. A second assignment is to supply a map to American agents supposedly outlining a planned German invasion of the United States via Mexico. Eva spots errors in the map, informing Lucas Romer and other colleagues of this, but chooses to continue the mission.

After Eva survives an attempt to kill her in the desert, through serendipitous circumstances the map makes its way to and fools the U.S. president, Roosevelt, as to German intentions. However, as her fellow agents in Romer's group die one by one, she knows that they have been betrayed, and she escapes into Canada. After the U.S. enters the war, Eva returns to London. She meets Alfie, the last remaining member of her group, but then kills him, fearing that he is the traitor. During a German bombing raid she and Romer attempt to kill each other after he follows her, but he gets away, and she disappears.

In the present, Ruth and Eva have managed, via Ruth's Ph.D supervisor, to identify Romer under his current assumed identity. Eva gets Ruth, posing as a journalist interested in wartime espionage, to contact Romer, which allows 'Sally' to follow and locate Romer's home address. The two women pay him a visit and his identity as the real traitor is revealed after more than thirty years. Romer, a double-agent for the USSR, commits suicide.

Cast
 Hayley Atwell as Sally Gilmartin aka Eva Delectorskaya (younger)
 Kevin Guthrie as Alfie Blytheswood
 Rufus Sewell as Lucas Romer
 Michelle Dockery as Ruth Gilmartin
 Charlotte Rampling as Sally Gilmartin aka Eva Delectorskaya (older)
 Gwilym Lee as Sean Gilmartin
 Michael Gambon as Lord Mansfield
 Michael Peter Willis as Jochen
 Tom Brooke as Angus Woolf
 Adrian Scarborough as Morris Devereux
 Bertie Carvel as Mason Harding
 David Butler as Keegan-Vale
 Julian Firth as Servant
 Catherine Harvey as Mrs. Dangerfield
 James Norton as Kolia
 Thekla Reuten as Sylvia Rhys Meyers
 Rob Ostlere as a shop assistant

Production
The drama was produced by Endor Productions in association with Sundance Channel. It was directed by Edward Hall, and produced by Hilary Bevan Jones and Paul Frift.

The exterior of the club, "Brydges", frequented by Lord Romer, was filmed at Bearwood House, Sindlesham in Berkshire.

Reception
Adrian Michaels, writing for The Daily Telegraph, praised the first part of the adaptation as "terrific", saying: "There was enough plot development to keep everything ticking along, but at an easy pace that was a welcome change from Scandinavian psychopaths starting a bloodbath every 15 minutes." The first part was also received well by John Crace in The Guardian; he commented on the high production values and compared it to another series featuring Dockery, saying it "was everything [Downton Abbey] isn't: well-acted, well-written, well-paced and well-filmed".

References

External links
 
 

2012 British television series debuts
2012 British television series endings
2010s British drama television series
BBC television dramas
2010s British television miniseries
Television shows based on British novels
Television series set in the 1970s
World War II television series
English-language television shows
Films with screenplays by William Boyd (writer)